Fengniancun Subdistrict is a subdistrict situated within Dongli District, Tianjin, China. It shares border with Zhangguizhuang Subdistrict to its west, and is surrounded by Xinli Subdistrict to all three other sides. Its population size was 19,075 as of 2010.

The subdistrict was established in 1988. Its name Fengniancun was taken from the local residential neighborhood constructed in 1979.

Administrative divisions 
At the end of 2022, the subdistrict oversaw the 3 following residential communities: Fengnianli, Xintaidao and Lixinli.

See also 

 List of township-level divisions of Tianjin

References 
Township-level divisions of Tianjin
Dongli District